Grind is the soundtrack to the 2003 skateboarding film, Grind. It was released on August 12, 2003 through Atlantic Records and consisted of a blend of alternative rock, punk rock, hip hop and reggae music.

Track listing
"Too Bad About Your Girl" [Radio Mix] - 2:56 (The Donnas) 
"Boom" - 3:07 (P.O.D.)
"Get Busy" [Clap Your Hands Now Remix] - 4:19 (Sean Paul featuring Fatman Scoop) 
"I'm Just a Kid" - 3:18 (Simple Plan)  
"Smoke Two Joints" - 2:39 (Sublime) 
"Seein' Red" - 3:48 (Unwritten Law)
"No Letting Go" - 3:23 (Wayne Wonder)
"The Jump Off" [Remix] - 4:27 (Lil' Kim featuring Mobb Deep & Mr. Cheeks)
"These Walls" - 4:06 (Trapt)   
"Poetic Tragedy" - 3:32 (The Used)  
"More Than a Friend" - 4:25 (All Too Much)
"Look What Happened" - 3:07 (Less Than Jake)  
"99 Bottles" - 3:27 (SLR Whitestarr) 
"Ay Dawg" - 3:06 (Jazze Pha) 
"Fly from the Inside" - 3:55 (Shinedown)  
"Goin' Down on It" - 4:52 (Hot Action Cop)
"Stupid Little Fellow" - 3:28 (The Peak Show)
"Pitiful" - 3:12 (Blindside)

References

Comedy film soundtracks
Hip hop soundtracks
2003 soundtrack albums
Atlantic Records soundtracks
Punk rock soundtracks
Alternative rock soundtracks
Reggae soundtracks